Amata cuprizonata is a moth of the subfamily Arctiinae. It was described by George Hampson in 1901. It is found in Kenya, South Africa, Tanzania and Uganda.

References

 

cuprizonata
Moths described in 1901
Moths of Africa